Cavour is a town in Beadle County, South Dakota, United States. The population was 128 at the 2020 census.

History
Cavour was laid out in 1880. The town was named for Camillo Benso, Count of Cavour, an Italian statesman.

2003 tornado outbreak
On June 24, 2003, at approximately 9:30pm, an F3 tornado passed southwest of town, sparing the town by  miles.

Geography

Cavour is located at  (44.369465, -98.038222).

Cavour has been assigned the ZIP code 57324 and the FIPS place code 10620.

Demographics

2010 census
As of the census of 2010, there were 114 people, 56 households, and 30 families residing in the town. The racial makeup of the town was 93.9% White, 3.5% from other races, and 2.6% from two or more races. Hispanic or Latino of any race were 7.9% of the population.

There were 56 households, of which 17.9% had children under the age of 18 living with them, 46.4% were married couples living together, 3.6% had a female householder with no husband present, 3.6% had a male householder with no wife present, and 46.4% were non-families. 39.3% of all households were made up of individuals, and 12.5% had someone living alone who was 65 years of age or older. The average household size was 2.04 and the average family size was 2.80.

The median age in the town was 49 years. 15.8% of residents were under the age of 18; 5.3% were between the ages of 18 and 24; 21.9% were from 25 to 44; 41.1% were from 45 to 64; and 15.8% were 65 years of age or older. The gender makeup of the town was 57.0% male and 43.0% female.

2000 census
As of the census of 2000, there were 141 people, 60 households, and 39 families residing in the town. The population density was 338.0 people per square mile (129.6/km2). There were 71 housing units at an average density of 170.2 per square mile (65.3/km2). The racial makeup of the town was 97.16% White, and 2.84% from two or more races.

There were 60 households, out of which 31.7% had children under the age of 18 living with them, 53.3% were married couples living together, 10.0% had a female householder with no husband present, and 35.0% were non-families. 33.3% of all households were made up of individuals, and 10.0% had someone living alone who was 65 years of age or older. The average household size was 2.35 and the average family size was 3.05.

In the town, the population was spread out, with 29.1% under the age of 18, 2.8% from 18 to 24, 29.8% from 25 to 44, 26.2% from 45 to 64, and 12.1% who were 65 years of age or older. The median age was 39 years. For every 100 females, there were 95.8 males. For every 100 females age 18 and over, there were 85.2 males.

The median income for a household in the town was $27,750, and the median income for a family was $38,750. Males had a median income of $24,688 versus $21,250 for females. The per capita income for the town was $15,358. There were 5.9% of families and 2.5% of the population living below the poverty line, including no under eighteens and none of those over 64.

References

Towns in Beadle County, South Dakota
Towns in South Dakota